A capability, in the systems engineering sense, is defined as the ability to execute a specified course of action. A capability may or may not be accompanied by an intention.  The term is used in the defense industry but also in private industry (e.g. gap analysis).

Capability gap analysis
The Joint Capabilities Integration Development System is an important part of DoD military planning.  The "Operation of the JCIDS" introduces a Capability Based Analysis (CBA) process that includes identification of capability gaps.  In essence, a Capability Gap Analysis is the determination of needed capabilities that do not yet exist. The Department of Defense Architecture Framework (DoDAF) suggests the use of the Operational Activity Model (OV-5) in conducting a CGA.

See also 
 Capability Management
 Operational Activity Model (OV-5)
 Operational Event-Trace Description (OV-6c)
 Joint Capabilities Integration Development System

References 

Systems engineering
Military acquisition
Military simulation